Greece competed at the 2013 World Games held in Cali, Colombia.

Medalists

Karate 

Georgios Tzanos won the bronze medal in the men's kumite 84 kg event.

Water skiing 

Marie Vympranietsova won the silver medal in the women's jump event.

References 

Nations at the 2013 World Games
2013 in Greek sport
2013